Denise C. Park is an American neuroscientist. She is the head of the Aging Mind Lab, the Principal Investigator of the Dallas Lifespan Brain Study (DLBS), and a Distinguished University Chair of the School and Behavioral and Brain Sciences at The University of Texas at Dallas.

Education 
Denise Park earned her Bachelor's degree in psychology from Albion College, and she graduated Summa Cum Laude and was a member of Phi Beta Kappa. She earned her Ph.D. in experimental psychology from the State University of New York at Albany at the age of 25.

Career 
Denise Park began as an assistant professor at the University of North Carolina at Charlotte, where she worked for eight years. She was the recruited by the University of Georgia, where she began to study the effects of context on memory and aging and also conducted a research program on memory for medications. From 1985 to 1994, Dr. Park was awarded over $1 million in funds for her research, primarily from The National Institute on Aging.  In 1995, she moved to the University of Michigan at Ann Arbor, where she was Professor of Psychology and began to transition her research program to fMRI research where she studied the function of the aging brain and cognition with an emphasis on visual memory. Her research was supported during this period of time with over $2 million in NIH funding. She then moved to the University of Illinois at Urbana-Champaign from 2002 to 2006, continuing her focus on visual memory and aging until 2006, when she began to focus on dedifferentiation and memory in the aging brain. In her time at the University of Illinois, she received over $2 million in funds for her research including an NIH MERIT Award. In 2007, she moved once again to the University of Texas at Dallas where she developed the Scaffolding Theory of Aging and Cognition with her colleague Patricia Reuter-Lorenz. She developed an interest in amyloid and tau PET imaging and received an NIH MERIT Award conduct the Dallas LifeSpan Brain Study.  The DLBS is in its third wave as of February 10th, 2022. 

Park has over 200 publications and was recently named one of the top 1000 female scientists around the world in Research.com's 2022 ranking.

Aging Mind Lab 
Currently, the Aging Mind Lab is researching how aging affects brain structure and function, the earliest possible detection of Alzheimer's disease, and how to intervene to slow the brain's decline.

Dallas Lifespan Brain Study 
Two preliminary findings of the DLBS include that a busy lifestyle may be linked to improved brain function in old age, especially regarding working memory, vocabulary, and reasoning; and that amyloid buildup decreases recall and recognition memory independent from the age group of the subject.

References

Further reading

External links
 Curriculum vitae
 Faculty webpage
 Park Aging Mind Lab 

Year of birth missing (living people)
Living people
American neuroscientists
Albion College alumni
University of Texas at Dallas faculty